Patricia Ruth "Pat" Sugden (also Harker and Merrick) is a fictional character from the British soap opera Emmerdale, played by actresses Lynn Dalby and Helen Weir.

Development
Pat is characterised as a "passionate and strong minded" female. Pat easily settles into farm life and contributes by taking over control of Sam Pearson's (Toke Townley) vegetable garden. Writers developed a marriage between Pat and Jack Sugden (Clive Hornby). They portrayed the Sugden marriage in stark contrast to the ideal marriage between Matt (Frederick Pyne) and Dolly Skilbeck (Jean Rogers). Pat's strong mindset often leads to arguments with Jack but they appear to enjoy this. Unlike the Skilbecks, Pat and Jack would be bored with a tranquil life and "enjoy the stimulation of pitting their wits against each other."

When Pat was originally featured in the series, Jack left her and moved away. This left Pat on the rebound and she marries Tom Merrick (Dave Hill). They later divorced and when she was reintroduced into the series she married Jack. Writers continued to give them a turbulent marriage and Jack has an affair with Karen Moore (Annie Hulley). His affair makes Pat question whether or not she made the correct decision marrying Jack. Another issue writers explored was Jack's relationship with Pat's children, including Sandie Merrick (Jane Hutcheson), which causes more friction.

Storylines

In September 1980, Ruth, now calling herself Pat, returned to Beckindale with Jackie and Sandie to stay with her aunt Elsie after she left Tom for good. But Elsie would not take them in as her children would make a lot of noise. Ny Estates found her a home in a grotty, stuffy caravan.
Later that year Tom came back to town but by this time Pat had started dating Jack again. Tom tried to frame Jack in an arson attack of which Jack had an alibi. Seth Armstrong found out the truth and told Tom to leave Beckindale with threats of disclosure.

In 1982, Pat and Jack married with Matt as best man and Sandie as bridesmaid. Pat and Jack were happy for quite a while until in 1984 when Jack had an affair with reporter Karen Moore. The couple split up for a while but later got back together. In 1985, Pat learned she was pregnant and gave birth to a son, Robert Jacob Sugden, in April 1986, which brought her and Jack closer together. However, that August tragedy struck when Pat died after her car crashed down a hillside when she swerved to avoid a flock of sheep. She had been returning home from dropping her sister Janie off at the train station after a visit. Pat's funeral was held on 2 September 1986 and she was buried in the village churchyard. Jack was left to bring up Robert alone, who grew up with no memories of his mother.

References

Emmerdale characters
Television characters introduced in 1972
Female characters in television